Daire Rendon (born May 26, 1952) is an American politician who has served in the Michigan House of Representatives from the 103rd district since 2017, succeeding her husband, Bruce, who was term-limited in 2016.

Career 

On November 18, 2020, Rendon introduced House Resolution No. 324 to impeach Governor Whitmer.
The state senate majority leader and state house speaker (both Republicans) opposed calls for impeachment, calling it "shameful".
The resolution was "dead on arrival", as the legislature had been adjourned and not expected to take action in a lame-duck session.

In December 2020, Rendon and Matt Maddock joined a federal lawsuit filed by Trump supporters to overturn the election results. The suit asked for state lawmakers to certify the election results, therefore allowing the Republican-led Michigan Legislature to overturn Biden's victory in the state. The judge dismissed the suit, stating that their arguments were "flat-out wrong" and "a fundamental and obvious misreading of the Constitution."

In August 2022, it was reported that Michigan Attorney General candidate Matthew DePerno, Rendon, and Barry County Sheriff Dar Leaf are among nine Michigan Republicans who could potentially face criminal charges over allegedly illegally accessing voting equipment in a quest to prove false claims of voter fraud in the 2020 election. In a letter to Michigan Secretary of State Jocelyn Benson, Chief Deputy Attorney General Christina M. Grossi requested a special prosecutor to consider bringing charges against the nine individuals.

References 

1952 births
Living people
Republican Party members of the Michigan House of Representatives
Women state legislators in Michigan
21st-century American politicians
21st-century American women politicians
People from Jacksonville, North Carolina